The Fair Pretender is a 1918 American silent drama film, directed by Charles Miller. It stars Madge Kennedy, Tom Moore, and Robert Walker, and was released on May 18, 1918.

Cast list
 Madge Kennedy as Sylvia Maynard
 Tom Moore as Don Meredith
 Robert Walker as Harcourt
 Paul Doucet as Ramon Gonzales
 Wilmer Walter as Captain Milton Brown
 Emmett King as Townsend
 John Terry as Freddie
 Charles Slattery as Barnum
 Florence Billings as Marjorie Townsend
 Grace Stevens as Mrs. Townsend

Preservation status
This film is listed as surviving in the Spanish archive: Instituto Valenciano De Cinematografia, Valencia [Spain].

References

External links

 (plot by Hal Erickson)

American silent feature films
Silent American drama films
1918 drama films
1918 films
Films directed by Charles Miller
American black-and-white films
1910s American films